The 79th Assembly District of Wisconsin is one of 99 districts in the Wisconsin State Assembly.  Located in south-central Wisconsin, the district comprises parts of central Dane County, including the city of Middleton and the village Waunakee.  The district is represented by Democrat Alex Joers, since January 2023.

The 79th Assembly District is located within Wisconsin's 27th Senate district, along with the 80th and 81st Assembly districts.

History 

The 79th Assembly district has had a volatile history in redistricting, and has had four major changes to its composition in the seven redistricting cycles since its creation.

The district was initially drawn encompassing most of Marquette County, the southern halves of Adams and Juneau counties, and parts of northern Columbia County and northern Sauk County.  The first representative of the district was Tommy Thompson, who previously represented the Adams–Juneau–Marquette district.  The 1982 court-ordered redistricting moved the 79th district to the city of Appleton, Wisconsin, in Outagamie County, roughly taking the place of the 42nd Assembly district.  The Legislature's 1983 redistricting act moved the district to south-central Wisconsin, comprising the southwest corner of Dane County, most of the northern quarter of Green County, and a small part of northwestern Rock County.  The 1992 redistricting made only minor changes to the 1983 map, but added half of the city of Middleton, which would become an anchor for the district over the next 30 years.  The 2002 map added more of Middleton and shrunk the geographic footprint of the district to a strip of western Dane County.  The 2011 redistricting act shed the towns of western Dane County and shifted the district to north-central Dane County, adding the village of Waunakee.  As the population of Middleton and Waunakee surged 25% and 23%, respectively, from the 2010 to 2020 census, the district shed remaining rural towns and became more concentrated around those two municipalities.

For notable past representatives, Tommy Thompson went on to become the 42nd Governor of Wisconsin and 19th United States Secretary of Health and Human Services.  David Prosser, Jr., went on to serve on the Wisconsin Supreme Court for 18 years.  Joe Wineke  later served as Chairman of the Democratic Party of Wisconsin.

List of past representatives

References 

Wisconsin State Assembly districts
Dane County, Wisconsin